Gene or Eugene Davis may refer to:
 Gene Davis (painter) (1920–1985), American painter
 Eugene M. Davis, American actor
 Gene Davis (wrestler) (born 1945), American wrestler who represented the United States at the 1976 Summer Olympics
 Gene Davis (politician) (born 1945), Utah politician
 Eugene Davis (doctor) (1870–1946), American doctor and college football coach
 Eugene Davis (Ghost Hunt), a character in the book series
 W. Eugene Davis (born 1936), American judge
Eugene Davis (1857–1897) Irish writer